Makerere is a neighborhood in the city of Kampala, Uganda's capital city. The name also applies to the hill on which this neighborhood is perched; one of the original seven hills that constituted Kampala at the time of its founding, in the early 1900s.

Location
Makerere is located in Kawempe Division. It is bordered by Bwaise to the north, Mulago to the east, Wandegeya and Nakasero to the southeast, Old Kampala to the south, Naakulabye to the southwest. Kasubi and Kawaala lie to the west of Makerere. The coordinates of Makerere are:0° 20' 6.00"N, 32° 34' 12.00"E (Latitude:0.3350; Longitude:32.5700).

Overview
Makerere Hill is occupied primarily by Makerere University. In the 1970s and 1980s, the university had nine Halls of Residence, six for men and three for women. During the 1990s and early 2000s, as the university intake and student population grew from about 5,000 to over 40,000, private hostels grew up all around the hill, outside the university compound, to accommodate the new student influx. The original halls of residence are:
 For men 1. Livingstone Hall 2. Lumumba Hall 3. Mitchell Hall 4. Nkrumah Hall 5. Nsibirwa Hall and 6. University Hall.
 For women 7. Africa Hall 8. Mary Stuart Hall and 9. CCE - Hall Complex.

Landmarks
These landmarks are located on Makerere Hill or near its borders:
 The main campus of Makerere University, Uganda's oldest university, founded in 1922.
 The campus of Makerere College School, a mixed, day & boarding secondary school (S1-S6), founded in 1945
 The Law Development Center, a postgraduate institution of learning that offers instruction that is required for lawyers to practice law in Uganda, established in 1970
 Nana Hostel - an upscale residential hostel for affluent university students

Other points of interest

These other points of interest also lie in or near Makerere:
 Makerere Kikoni - Located to the northwest of the university campus
 Bwaise slum - Located immediately north of the university campus
 Katanga slum - Located to the east of Makerere University, between the university campus and Mulago Hill
 Kiwuunya slum - Located between Makerere University and Naakulabye

See also
 Central Uganda
 Kampala Capital City Authority (KCCA)
 Kampala District
 Kawempe Division
 Makerere University

References

External links
 Website of Makerere University

Neighborhoods of Kampala
Cities in the Great Rift Valley
Kawempe Division